Anton Suseno (born 15 December 1971) is an Indonesian table tennis player. He competed at the 1992 Summer Olympics, the 1996 Summer Olympics, and the 2000 Summer Olympics.

References

External links
 

1971 births
Living people
Indonesian male table tennis players
Olympic table tennis players of Indonesia
Table tennis players at the 1992 Summer Olympics
Table tennis players at the 1996 Summer Olympics
Table tennis players at the 2000 Summer Olympics
People from Indramayu
Southeast Asian Games medalists in table tennis